The following highways are numbered 247:

Canada
 Manitoba Provincial Road 247
 Nova Scotia Route 247
 Prince Edward Island Route 247
 Quebec Route 247
 Saskatchewan Highway 247

Costa Rica
 National Route 247

Japan
 Japan National Route 247

United States
 Alabama State Route 247
 Arkansas Highway 247
 California State Route 247
 Florida State Road 247 
 Georgia State Route 247
 K-247 (Kansas highway)
 Kentucky Route 247
 Maryland Route 247
 M-247 (Michigan highway)
 Minnesota State Highway 247
 Montana Secondary Highway 247
 New Mexico State Road 247
 New York State Route 247
 Ohio State Route 247
 Pennsylvania Route 247
 South Carolina Highway 247
 South Dakota Highway 247
 Tennessee State Route 247 
 Texas State Highway 247 (former)
 Texas State Highway Spur 247
 Farm to Market Road 247
 Utah State Route 247 (former 1969-1985)
 Utah State Route 247 (former 1953-1969)
 Virginia State Route 247